William Msiska (born 10 October 1947) is a Malawian sprinter. He competed in the men's 400 metres at the 1972 Summer Olympics.

References

1947 births
Living people
Athletes (track and field) at the 1972 Summer Olympics
Malawian male sprinters
Olympic athletes of Malawi
Place of birth missing (living people)